Dibecik, formerly and still informally called Vasılı, is a village in the Oğuzeli District, Gaziantep Province, Turkey. The village is inhabited by Turkmens with a minority of Turkicized Arabs of the Damalha tribe and Abdals of the Kurular tribe.

References

Villages in Oğuzeli District